The 189th New York Infantry Regiment was an infantry regiment of the Union Army during the American Civil War.

Service 
In September 1864, the regiment's first two commanders received authority to recruit, and organized at Elmira, including four companies originally recruited for the 175th New York.  It was mustered in the service of the United States for one year in August and September, 1864. One company was transferred to the 15th Engineers, but was replaced by a new company.

The companies were recruited principally:
 A at Bath;
B at Bolivar, Wirt, Clarksville, Friendship, New Hudson, Caneadea and Alma;
 C at Wheeler, Bath, Avoca, Canoga and Urbana;
 D at Brookfield, Hamilton and Oswego;
 E in Oswego County;
 F at Constantia;
 G at Cohocton, Avoca and Wayland;
 H. at Bath;
 I in Allegany County; and
 K at Camden, Annsville, Lee, Paris, Westmoreland, Verona, Vernon and Vienna; and
 Second Company K, at Florence, Camden, Boonville, Avon, Westmoreland, Verona, Rome and Utica.

Four companies left the State September 18; the remaining companies October 23. The regiment served in the 2d Brigade, 1st Division, 5th Corps; and was honorably discharged and mustered out May 30 and June 1, 1865, near Washington, D. C. On January 11, 1865, Companies H and K went down the Jerusalem Plank Road (now a portion of U.S. Highway 301 near Petersburg known as the Crater Road) on a foraging expedition, where Confederate guerillas ambushed them and wounded Captain Burrage Rice, who was apparently executed by the guerillas after sending the train and men back to Union lines.

Total strength and casualties 
During its service the regiment lost by death, killed in action, 1 officer, 5 enlisted men; of wounds received in action, 3 enlisted men; of disease and other causes, 1 officer, 70 enlisted men; total, 2 officers, 78 enlisted men; aggregate, 80.

Commanders 
Colonel William A. Olmstead
Colonel William W. Hayt
Colonel Allen L. Burr

See also 

List of New York Civil War regiments

Notes

References 
The Civil War Archive

External links 
New York State Military Museum Unit History Project New York State Military Museum and Veterans Research Center - Civil War - 189th Infantry Regiment History, photographs, table of battles and casualties, and historical sketch for the 189th New York Infantry Regiment.
EXCERPT: Skirmish Near Warwick Swamp, January 11, 1865 (History of the 189th NY)

Infantry 189
1864 establishments in New York (state)
Military units and formations established in 1864
Military units and formations disestablished in 1865